Dagmar Herzog (born 1961) is Distinguished Professor of History and the Daniel Rose Faculty Scholar at the Graduate Center, City University of New York. She has published extensively on the histories of sexuality and gender, psychoanalysis, theology and religion, Jewish-Christian relations and Holocaust memory, and she has edited anthologies on sexuality in the Third Reich, sexuality in twentieth-century Austria, and the Holocaust.

Her most recent books include Unlearning Eugenics: Sexuality, Reproduction, and Disability in Post-Nazi Europe; Cold War Freud: Psychoanalysis in an Age of Catastrophes; Sex after Fascism: Memory and Morality in Twentieth-Century Germany; and Sex in Crisis: The New Sexual Revolution and the Future of American Politics.

Herzog graduated summa cum laude from Duke University. She received her Ph.D. from Brown University. Before going to the Graduate Center in 2005, Herzog taught at Michigan State, was a Mellon Fellow at Harvard and a member of the Institute for Advanced Study in Princeton, New Jersey. In 2012, she won a John Simon Guggenheim Memorial Foundation Fellowship for her work in Intellectual and Cultural History.

She is the daughter of the renowned scholar Frederick Herzog, who was a theology professor at Duke.

Bibliography
Books
Herzog, D: Unlearning Eugenics: Sexuality, Reproduction, and Disability in Post-Nazi Europe, (University of Wisconsin Press, George L. Mosse Series, 2018)
Herzog, D: Cold War Freud: Psychoanalysis in an Age of Catastrophes, (Cambridge University Press 2016)
Herzog, D: Sexuality in Europe: A Twentieth-Century History (Cambridge University Press 2011)
Herzog D: Sex in Crisis: The New Sexual Revolution and the Future of American Politics (Basic 2008).
Herzog D: Sex after Fascism: Memory and Morality in Twentieth-Century Germany (Princeton 2005); published in German translation as Die Politisierung der Lust: Sexualität in der deutschen Geschichte des 20. Jahrhunderts (Siedler/Random House 2005)
Herzog D: Intimacy and Exclusion: Religious Politics in Pre-Revolutionary Baden (Princeton 1996; Transaction 2007)
Edited Collections
Chelsea Schields and Dagmar Herzog, The Routledge Companion to Sexuality and Colonialism, (Routledge, 2021).
Fritz Morgenthaler, On the Dialectics of Psychoanalytic Practice, edited and with an Introduction by Dagmar Herzog (Routledge, 2020).
Rabinbach, An.: Staging the Third Reich, edited by S Geroulanos and D Herzog (Routledge 2020)
Herzog D (ed): Brutality and Desire: War and Sexuality in Europe's Twentieth Century (Palgrave 2009)
Herzog D (ed): Demokratie im Schatten der Gewalt: Geschichten des Privaten im deutschen Nachkrieg (with Daniel Fulda, Stefan-Ludwig Hoffmann, and Till van Rahden) (Wallstein 2008)
Herzog D (ed): Sexuality in Austria (with Gunter Bischof, Anton Pelinka, and Josef Köstlbauer) (Transaction 2007)
Herzog D (ed): Lessons and Legacies VII: The Holocaust in International Perspective (Northwestern 2006)
Herzog D (ed): Sexuality and German Fascism (Berghahn 2004)
Articles/Reviews/Essays
"The Death of God in West Germany: Between Secularization, Postfascism, and the Rise of Liberation Theology," in Die Gegenwart Gottes in der Moderne, ed. by Michael Geyer and Lucian Hölscher (Wallstein 2006)
"How Jewish is German Sexuality? Sex and Antisemitism in the Third Reich," in German History from the Margins, ed. by Neil Gregor et al. (Indiana 2006)
"Sexuality in the Postwar West," Journal of Modern History Vol. 78, No. 1, March 2006
"The Reception of the Kinsey Reports in Europe," Sexuality and Culture 10/1 (Winter 2006)
"Sex war Gestern," Cicero (January 2006)
"East Germany's Sexual Evolution," in Socialist Modern, ed. by Paul Betts and Katherine Pence (Michigan 2006)
"Sexual Morality in 1960s West Germany," German History 23/3 (2005)
"Sexuality, Memory, Morality," History and Memory 17/1-2 (Spring 2005)
"Sex and Secularization in Nazi Germany," in Fascism and Neofascism: Critical Writings on the Radical Right in Europe, ed. by Angelica Fenner and Eric Weitz (Palgrave 2004)
"Postwar Ideologies and the Body Politics of 1968," in German Ideologies since 1945: Studies in the Political Thought and Culture of the Bonn Republic, ed. by Jan-Werner Mueller (Palgrave 2003)
"Desperately Seeking Normality: Sex and Marriage in the Wake of the War," in Life after Death: Approaches to a Cultural and Social History of Europe during the 1940s and 1950s, ed. by Richard Bessel and Dirk Schumann (Cambridge 2003)
"Antifaschistische Koerper: Studentenbewegung, sexuelle Revolution und antiautoritaere Kindererziehung," in Nachkrieg in Deutschland, ed. by Klaus Naumann (Hamburger Edition, 2001)
"Sexuelle Revolution und Vergangenheitsbewaeltigung," in Zeitschrift für Sexualforschung 13/2 (June 2000)
"'Pleasure, Sex, and Politics Belong Together': Post-Holocaust Memory and the Sexual Revolution in West Germany," in Intimacy, ed. by Lauren Berlant (Chicago, 2000)
Sample of Interviews
Interview with Virginia Prescott, New Hampshire Public Radio. July 8, 2008.
Interview with Jeff Schechtman, KVON-AM. August 6, 2008.

See also
Do Communists Have Better Sex? – a documentary she is featured in

References

External links
Faculty page
Video - Keynote Lecture, Max Weber Programme, Dagmar Herzog "On Aggression: Psychoanalysis as Moral Politics in Post-Nazi Germany," December 10, 2014

1961 births
Harvard University people
Brown University alumni
Michigan State University faculty
Graduate Center, CUNY faculty
Duke University alumni
Living people